The Canadian Federation of Agriculture (CFA) is Canada's largest general farm organization, representing 200,000 farmers and farm families.  The organization is headquartered in Ottawa, Ontario, with the mandate to provide a unified industry voice at the national level. The CFA was formed in 1935, and continues today as a farmer-funded, national umbrella organization representing provincial general farm organizations and national commodity groups.

Activities 
 To coordinate the efforts of agricultural producer organizations throughout Canada for the purpose of promoting their common interest through collective action.
 To assist members and where necessary government, in forming and promoting national agricultural policies to meet changing domestic and international economic conditions; and to collaborate and cooperate with organized groups of producers outside Canada to further this objective.
 To promote and advance acceptance of positive social, economic and environmental conditions of those engaged in agricultural pursuits.

To promote awareness of agricultural producer organizations, the CFA sponsors a "Food Freedom Day", the date when an average Canadian family has earned enough income to pay the grocery bill for the entire year.  In 2008, the Ontario Federation of Agriculture calculated that it took 34 days (Feb. 3, 2008) for the average Ontario family to make enough to cover their food expenses for the year. The 2016 date for Food Freedom Day is  February 8.

Elected Executives 
The current President of the Canadian Federation of Agriculture is Mary Robinson.  She is the first female to hold this position. Robinson had previously been the chairperson of the Canadian Ag HR Council and, before that, President of the PEI Federation of Agriculture.  The current First Vice President is Keith Currie, past president of the Ontario Federation of Agriculture, and the acting Second Vice President is Todd Lewis, current President of APAS (Agricultural Producers Association of Saskatchewan).

CFA Membership and Policy Development 
Being a federation of organizations, the deliberative body is composed of provincial farm organizations and commodity groups. Policy is generally developed in the form of grassroots resolutions, passed through member organizations and finally brought before the general assembly for a vote at the Annual General Meeting. Additional policy development decisions are deliberated by the 24 board members. Organizational decision-making is decided through a subset of the board of directors, called the National Council.

Members of the Canadian Federation of Agriculture currently include:

Provincial Farm Organizations:

Commodity Groups and Other Organizations:

References

External links
 Canadian Federation of Agriculture

Agricultural organizations based in Canada
Civic and political organizations of Canada
Organizations established in 1935